Rolf Göran Forsmark (4 February 1955 – 9 August 2020) was a  Swedish actor.

Forsmark was born in Malmberget. He studied at NAMA in Malmö between 1976 and 1979 and went on to work in film and theatre.

The actor died on 9 August 2020 at the age of 65.

Selected filmography

Film

Television

References

External links
 

1955 births
2020 deaths
People from Gällivare Municipality
Swedish male film actors
Swedish male stage actors
20th-century Swedish male actors
21st-century Swedish male actors